Piz Dora (2,951 m) is a mountain of the Ortler Alps, overlooking Tschierv in the canton of Graubünden. It lies south of Piz Daint, on the range between the Val Mora and the Val Müstair.

References

External links
 Piz Dora on Hikr

Mountains of the Alps
Mountains of Graubünden
Ortler Alps
Mountains of Switzerland
Two-thousanders of Switzerland
Val Müstair